NTSF:SD:SUV:: (National Terrorism Strike Force: San Diego: Sport Utility Vehicle::) is an American television comedy that parodies the police procedural and action film genres. The series starred Paul Scheer, June Diane Raphael, Brandon Johnson, Kate Mulgrew, Rebecca Romijn, Martin Starr, Karen Gillan, Rob Riggle, and Peter Serafinowicz. NTSF:SD:SUV:: aired three seasons on Adult Swim from July 22, 2011 to December 13, 2013. A number of special episodes were included within the broadcast of the series. In a 2014 interview, Scheer stated that the show is on an indefinite hiatus, with no immediate plans for a return.

Cast

Production
Created by comedian Paul Scheer, NTSF:SD:SUV:: (National Terrorism Strike Force: San Diego: Sport Utility Vehicle::) was first featured in a set of mock promotional television advertisements shot as a backdoor pilot and aired during season one broadcasts of Childrens Hospital on Adult Swim. The mock promos starred Scheer as agent Trent Hauser, along with June Diane Raphael, Brandon Johnson, and Rob Riggle. From the mock promos, the program was ordered to series with a 12-episode season, adding Kate Mulgrew, Rebecca Romijn, and Martin Starr to the cast. NTSF:SD:SUV:: premiered on July 21, 2011. The series has aired three seasons, with the third concluding in 2013. In a 2014 interview, Scheer stated that the show is on an indefinite hiatus, with no immediate plans for a return.

Episodes

Season 1 (2011)

Season 2 (2012-2013)

Season 3 (2013)

Specials

Webisodes: Inertia

Special episodes

Spin-off

International broadcast
In Canada, NTSF:SD:SUV:: previously aired on G4's Adult Digital Distraction block, and currently airs on the Canadian version of Adult Swim.

References

External links
 
 Paul Scheer talks about the history of the show
 

2010s American police comedy television series
2010s American parody television series
2010s American satirical television series
2011 American television series debuts
2013 American television series endings
Adult Swim original programming
American television spin-offs
English-language television shows
Television series by Williams Street
Television shows set in San Diego
Crime drama web series
American comedy web series